The Charlton Recreation Area is a public use area of the Ouachita National Forest, located just north of United States Route 270 between Crystal Springs and Mount Ida, Arkansas. The area includes a campground and day use facilities for water-related activities on Walnut Creek, including fishing and swimming. The facilities are organized around a small artificial lake created in 1938 by a crew of the Civilian Conservation Corps by damming the creek.

See also
National Register of Historic Places listings in Garland County, Arkansas

References

Buildings and structures completed in 1938
Buildings and structures in Garland County, Arkansas
Civilian Conservation Corps in Arkansas
Ouachita National Forest
National Register of Historic Places in Garland County, Arkansas
Campgrounds in the United States
Dams on the National Register of Historic Places in Arkansas
1938 establishments in Arkansas